The Tin How Temple (also spelled Tianhou Temple) is the oldest extant Taoist temple in San Francisco's Chinatown, and one of the oldest still-operating Chinese temples in the United States. It is dedicated to the Chinese sea goddess Mazu, who is known as Tin How (天后, Empress of Heavens) in Cantonese.

History
The temple was founded in 1852, reportedly at its current location by Day Ju, one of the first Chinese persons to arrive in San Francisco. The building was later destroyed in the 1906 earthquake and fire, with the image of the goddess, the temple bell, and part of the altar surviving. By then, ownership of the building site had transitioned to the Sue Hing Benevolent Association, which reopened it in 1910 on the top floor of a four-story building it built on the site. The temple closed in 1955 and reopened on May 4, 1975, after the Immigration and Nationality Act of 1965 had caused a rejuvenation of San Francisco's Chinatown.

In May 2010, the one-hundredth anniversary of the temple was celebrated by a religious procession through the streets in the neighborhood, including dances and fireworks.

Visiting
The temple is open daily between 10:00 A.M. and 3:00 P.M., excepting holidays. Admission is free with permission from the attendant, and donations are accepted. Photography is not allowed inside the temple.

See also
Although both temples are dedicated to Mazu, the Tin How Temple is not to be confused with the "Ma-Tsu Temple of U.S.A." two blocks north of it, which was founded in 1986 with affiliation to the Chaotian Temple in Taiwan. There is also another temple that is dedicated to Mazu in Los Angeles's Chinatown which is known as Thien Hau Temple (Los Angeles).

Other Notable Chinese temples
 Temple of Kwan Tai (武帝廟) located in Mendocino, California
 Bok Kai Temple (北溪廟) located in the city of Marysville, California
 Kong Chow Temple (岡州古廟) located in San Francisco, California
 Weaverville Joss House (雲林廟), located in the center of the town of Weaverville, California

Gallery

References

External links 

 Tin How Temple at chinatownology.com
 
 

Chinatown, San Francisco
Religious buildings and structures in San Francisco
Taiwanese-American culture in California
Taoist temples in the United States
Temples in California